Trinity Baptist College (TBC) is a private independent Baptist college in Jacksonville, Florida.  It was founded in 1974 by Trinity Baptist Church. It is accredited by the Transnational Association of Christian Colleges and Schools.

History 
Trinity Baptist College was founded in 1974.  It was originally located on McDuff Avenue near downtown Jacksonville.

In 1988, Trinity Baptist College expanded and moved to the west-side of Jacksonville. In 1998 the college was accredited by the Trans-national Association of Christian Colleges and Schools.

Academics 
Trinity Baptist College currently offers Associate, Bachelor, and Master level degree programs. The newest programs to Trinity are the 3+3 Pre-Law program and the Business Administration program.

Societies 
The student body is divided into eight groups known as societies, each having a name consisting of three Greek letters, similar to the style of fraternities and sororities. There are four societies for the men and four for the women. These have been established to provide Christian fellowship through meetings, activities, and competitions. The societies are involved in school projects and in fund-raising. Each has its own elected officials and offers opportunities for members to develop as leaders.

The societies at Trinity Baptist College are:

Men's societies 
 Sigma Lambda Kappa—ΣΛΚ
 (Speiron ton Logon Kuriou—Sowing the Word of the Lord)
 Pi Ro Pi—ΠΡΠ
 (Pur, Romphaia, Pneuma—Fire, Sword, Spirit)
 Pi Theta Kappa—ΠΘΚ
 (Parakletoi Theu Kosmos—Advocates of God to the World)
 Alpha Omega Epsilone—ΑΩΕ
 (Emi to Alpha ki to Omega—I Am the Alpha and the Omega)

Women's societies 
 Tri Delta—ΔΔΔ
 (Dioko, Douleuo, Doxazo—Follow, Serve, Glorify)
 Tau Theta Epsilon—ΤΘΕ
 (Tas Thugatras Eireineis—Daughters of Peace)
 Kappa Delta Chi—ΚΔΧ
 (Katharos Dia Christon—Pure on Account of Christ)
 Pi Epsilon Alpha—ΠΕΑ
 (Pistis, Elpis, Agape—Faith, Hope, Charity)

Athletics
Trinity Baptist College competes as the Eagles in the National Christian College Athletic Association.

The Eagles field women's teams in Volleyball, Basketball, Soccer, and Softball.  Men's sports include Soccer, Basketball, and Baseball.  All sports compete at the division 2 level except baseball and softball, which are division 1.

TBC has won several national titles in various sports. These include Men's Soccer (NCCAA 2015), Men's Basketball (BCNIT 2006, 2009, 2012, 2014), and Women's Basketball (BCNIT 2019).

Notable alumni

David Meeks, Republican member of the Arkansas House of Representatives from Conway, Arkansas
Paul Chappell, Pastor of Lancaster Baptist Church and President of West Coast Baptist College.

References

External links 
 Official website
 Official athletics website

Independent Baptist universities and colleges in the United States
Transnational Association of Christian Colleges and Schools
Universities and colleges in Jacksonville, Florida
Private universities and colleges in Florida
Educational institutions established in 1974
1974 establishments in Florida